Abdel Hadi El-Gazzar (born 16 July 1960) is an Egyptian basketball player. He competed in the men's tournament at the 1984 Summer Olympics.

References

1960 births
Living people
Egyptian men's basketball players
Olympic basketball players of Egypt
Basketball players at the 1984 Summer Olympics
Place of birth missing (living people)